Vivekananda College, Agastheeswaram, is a general degree college located in Agastheeswaram, Kanyakumari district, Tamil Nadu. It was established in the year 1965. The college is affiliated with Manonmaniam Sundaranar University. This college offers different courses in arts, commerce and science.

Departments

Science
Physics
Chemistry
Mathematics
Botany
Zoology
Computer Application

Arts and Commerce
Tamil
English
Economics
Commerce

Accreditation
The college is  recognized by the University Grants Commission (UGC).

References

External links

Educational institutions established in 1965
1965 establishments in Madras State
Colleges affiliated to Manonmaniam Sundaranar University
Universities and colleges in Kanyakumari district